Jacob Mueller (March 9, 1822 – August 31, 1905) was an American politician who served as the tenth lieutenant governor of Ohio from 1872 to 1874.

Biography
Jacob Mueller was born in Alsenz, Germany in 1822, and studied Jurisprudence. He practiced law until 1859 when he originated and established the German Insurance Company for which he was Superintendent until 1869 when he resigned and returned to law. In 1849 he participated in the revolution in that country, and served for a short time as Chief Commissary, or Governor of his home district. He was compelled to leave the country, and emigrated to Cleveland, Ohio. He was naturalized, and affiliated with the Republican Party.

Career
Mueller studied law with Willey & Carey in 1850 through 1851; and was admitted to the bar in 1854. 
He was elected to City Council. He studied law and was admitted to the bar. He was elected lieutenant governor in 1871, and served one term. He afterward became a member of the Democratic Party.

Death
Muller died in 1905 and was buried at Woodland Cemetery in Cleveland, Ohio.

References

External links

 

Lawyers from Cleveland
Ohio Republicans
Ohio lawyers
1822 births
Ohio Constitutional Convention (1873)
1905 deaths
Lieutenant Governors of Ohio
German emigrants to the United States
Ohio Democrats
Cleveland City Council members
19th-century American newspaper publishers (people)
German-American Forty-Eighters
Journalists from Ohio
Burials at Woodland Cemetery (Cleveland)
19th-century American politicians